Wangdi may refer to:

 Wangdue Phodrang District (ru), a place in Bhutan
 Tenzing Norgay, born Namgyal Wangdi, a Nepalese Sherpa mountaineer